The 2014 CONCACAF Champions League Final was the final of the 2013–14 CONCACAF Champions League, the 6th edition of the CONCACAF Champions League under its current format, and overall the 49th edition of the premium football club competition organized by CONCACAF, the regional governing body of North America, Central America, and the Caribbean.

The final was contested in two-legged home-and-away format between two Mexican teams, Cruz Azul and Toluca. The first leg was hosted by Cruz Azul at Estadio Azul in Mexico City on April 15, 2014, while the second leg was hosted by Toluca at Estadio Nemesio Díez in Toluca on April 23, 2014. The winner earned the right to represent CONCACAF at the 2014 FIFA Club World Cup, entering at the quarterfinal stage.

The first leg ended in a 0–0 draw, and the second leg ended in a 1–1 draw, giving Cruz Azul a record-setting sixth CONCACAF club title (and their first during the Champions League era) on the away goals rule.

Background
For the fifth time in six seasons of the CONCACAF Champions League, the final was played between two Mexican sides. This guaranteed a Mexican champion for the ninth straight year and 30th time since the confederation began staging the tournament in 1962 (including the tournament's predecessor, the CONCACAF Champions' Cup). Both clubs had won the CONCACAF Champions' Cup, with Cruz Azul winning five times (1969, 1970, 1971, 1996, 1997), a record they shared with América, and Toluca winning twice (1968, 2003). During the Champions League era, Cruz Azul had lost in two finals (2009, 2010), while Toluca's previous best record was reaching the semifinals.

Cruz Azul finished top of Group 3 ahead of Herediano and Valencia in the group stage, and were seeded second for the championship stage, where they eliminated Sporting Kansas City in the quarterfinals and Tijuana in the semifinals.

Toluca finished top of Group 6 ahead of Comunicaciones and Caledonia AIA in the group stage, and were seeded first for the championship stage, where they eliminated San Jose Earthquakes in the quarterfinals and Alajuelense in the semifinals.

Road to the final

Note: In all results below, the score of the finalist is given first (H: home; A: away).

Rules
The final was played on a home-and-away two-legged basis. The away goals rule was used if the aggregate score was level after normal time of the second leg, but not after extra time, and so the final was decided by penalty shoot-out if the aggregate score was level after extra time of the second leg.

Matches

First leg

Second leg

References

External links
CONCACAF Champions League, CONCACAF.com

Finals
Cruz Azul matches
Deportivo Toluca F.C. matches
2013–14 in Mexican football
International club association football competitions hosted by Mexico
CONCACAF Champions League finals